Hartford Township is a township in Todd County, Minnesota, United States. The population was 677 at the 2000 census.

Hartford Township was organized in 1867.

Geography

Demographics
As of the census of 2000, there were 677 people, 215 households, and 179 families residing in the township.  The population density was 19.3 people per square mile (7.5/km2).  There were 225 housing units at an average density of 6.4/sq mi (2.5/km2).  The racial makeup of the township was 98.38% White, 0.15% Asian, 0.15% from other races, and 1.33% from two or more races. Hispanic or Latino of any race were 1.62% of the population.

There were 215 households, out of which 43.7% had children under the age of 18 living with them, 70.7% were married couples living together, 5.6% had a female householder with no husband present, and 16.7% were non-families. 13.0% of all households were made up of individuals, and 5.6% had someone living alone who was 65 years of age or older.  The average household size was 3.15 and the average family size was 3.49.

In the township the population was spread out, with 33.1% under the age of 18, 8.0% from 18 to 24, 29.1% from 25 to 44, 18.3% from 45 to 64, and 11.5% who were 65 years of age or older.  The median age was 34 years. For every 100 females, there were 124.9 males.  For every 100 females age 18 and over, there were 126.5 males.

The median income for a household in the township was $41,250, and the median income for a family was $43,125. Males had a median income of $27,000 versus $23,125 for females. The per capita income for the township was $14,416.  About 8.4% of families and 13.8% of the population were below the poverty line, including 18.0% of those under age 18 and 7.7% of those age 65 or over.

References

Townships in Todd County, Minnesota
Townships in Minnesota